The 1994 Irish local elections for borough and town councillors and commissioners were held on Thursday, 9 June 1994. Elections to county and city councils had been held in 1991. The municipal elections were postponed in 1991 to allow passage of the Local Government Act, 1994, under which the boundaries of many towns were altered. The 1994 European Parliament election, Údarás na Gaeltachta election, and Dáil by-elections in Dublin South-Central and Mayo West were held on the same day.

Results
The total electorate was 429,431, from which 251,605 votes were cast, giving a turnout of 58.59%. There were 2,555 spoilt votes.

Details

Footnotes

References

Sources

Citations

 
Local elections
1994
1994 elections in the Republic of Ireland
June 1994 events in Europe